The 2023 World Surf League is the 46th season of all iterations of the tour circuit for professional surfers. Billabong Pipe Masters will be the first round of the tour.

For the third time, the season will end at Lower Trestles, in San Clemente, USA, with the top five seeded men and women from the season going head to head to determine the champion at the WSL Finals.

Filipe Toledo and Stephanie Gilmore are the defending champions.

The 2023 season will also contribute towards qualification for the 2024 Summer Olympics, where surfing will make its second appearance as an Olympic sport. The top ten surfers in the men's final standings and the top eight surfers in the women's final standings will earn quota places at the Olympics, subject to a maximum of two men and two women per NOC.

Schedule 
The championship series will consist of the following events, subject to change due to the COVID-19 pandemic.

Results and Standings

Event Results

Men's Standings 
Points are awarded using the following structure:

Event Wild Card Surfers do not receive points for the WSL. Their results on each event are indicated on the above table but no ranking points are awarded.

Women's Standings 
Points are awarded using the following structure:

References

External links
 

 
World Surf League
World Surf League
World Surf League